The 1998 World War 3 was the fourth and final World War 3 professional wrestling pay-per-view (PPV) event produced by World Championship Wrestling (WCW). The event took place on November 22, 1998 from The Palace of Auburn Hills in Auburn Hills, Michigan, the same location as the previous year's event. This event marked the only instance where the traditional World War 3 battle royal did not headline the event.

Seven matches were contested at the event. The main event was a standard wrestling match between Diamond Dallas Page and Bret Hart for the WCW United States Heavyweight Championship, in which Page pinned Hart to retain the title. The World War 3 match, where the winner would receive a WCW World Heavyweight Championship match at Starrcade, was won by Kevin Nash.

Storylines
The event featured wrestlers from pre-existing scripted feuds and storylines. Wrestlers portrayed villains, heroes, or less distinguishable characters in the scripted events that built tension and culminated in a wrestling match or series of matches.

Event

The match between Kevin Nash and Scott Hall was cancelled after Eric Bischoff came out and ordered Vincent, Scott Norton, The Giant, Stevie Ray and Brian Adams to attack Hall. Nash then came out and saved Hall from the beatdown. In the "World War 3" World War 3 battle royal. Nash last eliminated Luger to earn a shot at the WCW World Heavyweight Championship at Starrcade.

Reception
In 2017, Kevin Pantoja of 411Mania gave the event a rating of 3.0 [Bad], stating, "Exactly what you can expect from WCW in 1998. Lots of bad matches, one or two good ones and a lot of questionable booking decisions. How do you not book your top champion? He was the most over thing in any segment he was involved in. They scheduled some matches and didn’t deliver. The show gets off to one of the worst starts ever until the Cruiserweight Title went on. Jericho’s match was heatless, World War 3 itself was kind of a mess and the main event got ruined by the booking nonsense."

Results

References

External links
World War 3 1998

WCW World War 3
1998 in Michigan
Events in Michigan
Professional wrestling in Auburn Hills, Michigan
November 1998 events in the United States
1998 World Championship Wrestling pay-per-view events